The Appearance of Corruption is a principle of law mentioned in or relevant to several SCOTUS decisions related to campaign finance in the United States, while the basis of the principle 'corruption' refers to dishonest or illegal behavior for personal gain. Corruption has existed since ancient times, and there are a series of factors that cause the appearance of it. On the other hand, corruption adversely affects these factors. In the process of fighting against the appearance of corruption, both the government and different organizations take steps to prevent it.

History 
Because of the timeless and universality nature of corruption, the appearance of corruption can be traced back to ancient ages and appears in various countries.

In the dynasty I of ancient Egypt, the appearance of corruption has been found in their legal institutions, and the appearance of corruption has also been found in the writing documents of the fourth century B.C. India and in the work of ancient Greek philosophers. Up to now, the act of corruption has become a common behavior in all levels of society because of the fast-economic expansion. By the estimation of The World Bank, international bribery is about 2% of the global GDP, however since the behavior of corruption conducts in secret, it is nearly impossible to obtain an accurate estimation. Hence, the reality of the situation can be even worse than reported.

Causes by

Political and economic environment

Four ways of how the political and economic environment influent corruption 

 The higher the decision right of administration officials, the more corruptions are likely to appear. This is because the concentration of power to certain officials makes bribery easier as there are less supervision for them. 
 Monetary policy influent the level of corruption, countries under better financial regulation with well-controlled interest rate appears to be less corrupt than the countries with an excessively informal economy. 
 Poor public administrative efficiency encourages individual corruptions. While, low wages increase the possibility of the appearance of corruption, because low income makes employees more likely to accept bribes. However, there is no evidence to show that high wages can lower the possibility of accepting bribes. A high income can enhance the negotiating ability of administration officials, which means they can receive bribes more easily, so the wage level is not a major determinant. 
 The corruption of senior officials of public administration institutes has an impact on the level of corruption since corruption will be permeated in all levels of the institute.

Legislation and work ethics 
Inefficient sanctions and punishments of corruption lead to more corruption. Inefficient sanctions decrease the cost of crime, which makes the act of corruption even more blatant, so inflicting severe punishment on corruption is necessary. Countries with common law are less corrupt compare to countries without common law. Also, the standard of work ethics can change in different time periods. In transition countries, the standard of work ethics is lower, so corruption is more likely to exist.

Poverty 
The increase in the behavior of corruption correlates with the rate of poverty. It is more critical for poorer counties to spend money on infrastructure construction rather than establishing a perfect legal system since the limited budget. It is more likely for an individual to bribe when he/she is still facing problems of basic needs- for instance, food, education, licenses.

Property right 
Lower levels of property right increase the behavior of corruption. For private sectors or individuals, property right is a risk, especially when they are in a country which has no perfect property right protection system. There is a possibility for them to seek security by corrupt behavior.

Natural resources endowment 
Rich natural resources offer more opportunity for corruption, and mineral, ore and fuel resources increase the behavior of corruption the most.

Ethnological factors 
Not every country has the same attitude towards corruption. In North Europe, corruption is unacceptable, but corruption is normal in the South. Different religion also causes a different attitude towards corruption. For instance, countries with a Protestant background are less likely to be corrupted.

Consequences and impacts

Total investment 
Total investment includes private investment and public investment. The economists have reached a conscience on the negative impact of corruption on private investment, but there are still wide controversies about the impact of corruption on public investment. How corruption influences private investment is clear. Some individuals are willing to bribe officials to get the license for investment, which raises the threshold of private investment and makes the process of investing complicated. These facts cause some profitable project cannot be implemented, and as a result, corruption leads to a decrease in private investment; the impacts of corruption on public investment are disputed, but among all the statements, most economists believe that corruption leads to an increase in public investment since corrupt officials have more opportunities to manipulate the expenditure in order to get more bribes. As a whole, corruption results in a decrease in total investment.

Foreign direct investment and international trade 
Individuals and companies need public permits to involve in foreign direct investment. In corrupt countries, the acts of corruption to get permits for investing foreign countries increase the cost and further reducing foreign direct investment, and some individuals and companies would choose not to be part of the corruption, so they are less likely to participate in the foreign direct investments, which also reduce foreign direct investment. Certain permits are also requisite for engaging in international trade, so the case is similar to how corruption affects foreign direct investment. In addition, corruptions have a negative impact on both importing counties and exporting countries.

Gross domestic product 
Corruption lower the per capita GDP; a low per capita GDP also increases the level of corruption. Corruption is an obstacle to investments and production levels, which decrease GDP. However, a country with low GDP is hard to control the act of corruption, which increases the level of corruption.

Shadow economy 
It is widely disputed that it is corruption that causes a shadow economy or shadow economy causes corruption. The causality is still unclear. In high-income countries, corruption and shadow economy might be in a correlation of substitution. In low-income countries, these two might be complements.

Inequality and poverty 
The appearance of corruption leads to inequality and an increase in the number of people in poverty. The privileged people make a profit from bribes, but ordinary people do not profit. There are also some other economists who stated that it is inequality and poverty cause corruption since only the rich and the privileged people receive bribes, and the poor have no way to monitor them.

Crime 
In a corrupt country, crime organization can conduct lawful business to launder money without being disturbed by officials, and they can even hold a monopoly for their business by bribing, so corruption provides an environment for crime and results in an increase in the number of organized crimes.

Prevention

In government 

 Establishing accountability mechanism and increasing transparency. The accountability mechanism should be generated and controlled by both the government and the general public in order to make this mechanism work. In most developing countries, there were only 2% of the population engaging in government work. In the new approach, the rest 98% should also be a part of the government work for supervision. 
 Raising public awareness, disseminating knowledge about corruption among the public by news, radios and conducting seminars to educate the public. It is important to build integrity among the people, which sets a foundation for building an integral society. 
 Strengthening the ability construction of government and establishing a better atmosphere of integrity among government officials. 
 Including integrity issues in economic reform.

In other organizations 
In most countries, audit offices have no right to investigate, they can only report corrupt cases to investigate authorities, which indeed tried some of the cases, but also made the process less efficient. Therefore, measures need to be taken by different organizations themselves to combat corruption issues. For instance, establishing spiritual leadership. The spirituality in an organization is not the same as that in religions, but there were similarities. In religions, the moral character of a person was emphasized. In organizations, some practices like optimism, motivating and communicativeness could have been associated with their spirituality and also moral character. The general idea is that leaders can be role models to motivate followers and guide them in the correct value.

Examples 
Because the history of corruption might have existed ever since the human civilization was originated, the exact date of when corruption first appeared in human history cannot be verified, but the examples of corruptions that found in ancient mythology can be considered as the first time that human being realized the presence of corruption. In ancient china mythology, there is a kitchen god in every family, and their job is to watch and evaluate the behavior of each family member. In the last week of a year, kitchen gods would present their observation to the ruler of heaven. Based on the behavior of each family, different awards or punishments would be given to each family. In order to gain a better life in the coming year, many families would bribe their kitchen god by smearing sugar and honey onto the picture of it. Old myths reveal that the idea of corruption has been permeated in people's mind for a long time. In modern society, the behavior of corruption constantly occurs. Here are some famous cases of corruption.

Draining Nigeria of its arrest 
Sani Abacha was the president of Nigeria from 1993 to 1998. After he died in 1998, there were sources claim that he took 3 to 5 billion American dollars of public funds. After efforts of the US justice department and 5-year litigation, 458 million dollars has been found and frozen, and 268 million dollars that Sani Abacha put in the Deutsche bank has been returned to Nigeria.

The Gupta family 
In 2015, the Gupta family bought the Optimum Coal Mine and made profits by cutting the health insurance of staffs and cutting corners when repairing machines. To avoid investigation, they bribed the president Zuma and made him fire intelligence officials and tax officials. In 2016, a vice minister revealed that the Gupta family offered him 45 million US dollars and tried to make him fire treasury officials. The Gupta family fled from South Africa after disclosure, and president Zuma also lost his position and faced charges.

The 1MDB fund: from Malaysia to Hollywood 
The former prime minister of Malaysia Najib Razak was charged for embezzling money illegally from 1Malaysia Development Berhad. He spent over billions of American dollars on real estate, gifts for celebrities, paintings, and jewelry for his wife. However, Najib Razak and his wife refused to plead guilty.

Siemens: corruption made in Germany 
Siemens has a high reputation all over the world before the scandal, but in fact, there was a corruption system built in Siemens since the 1990s, and because many countries did not have a perfect law system at the time, Siemens made a significant profit by exploiting some holes in the law. In 2008, the first revelation of the scandal shocked the world. It involved four continents and more than 1.4 billion dollars, which made it the biggest corruption case at the time.

Examples of SCOTUS 
 Buckley v. Valeo
Davis v. FEC
Citizens United v. FEC
First National Bank of Boston v. Bellotti
McConnell v. FEC
McCutcheon v. FEC

See also
 ISO 37001 Anti-bribery management systems
 Group of States Against Corruption
 International Anti-Corruption Academy
 United Nations Convention against Corruption
 OECD Anti-Bribery Convention

References

Supreme Court of the United States
 
Crime